The Singles Collection is an album by guitarist Terje Rypdal recorded in 1988 and released on the ECM label.

Reception
The Allmusic review by  Michael P. Dawson awarded the album 4 stars stating "The title is a joke: this is actually the third album by the Chasers".

Track listing
All compositions by Terje Rypdal except as indicated
 "There Is a Hot Lady in My Bedroom and I Need a Drink" - 4:27 
 "Sprøtt" - 4:37 
 "Mystery Man" - 4:42 
 "The Last Hero" (Allan Dangerfield) - 2:37 
 "Strange Behaviour" (Dangerfield) - 3:01 
 "U.'N.I." - 5:36 
 "Coyote" (Dangerfield) - 2:53 
 "Somehow, Somewhere" - 3:02 
 "Steady" - 4:09 
 "Crooner Song" - 2:51 
Recorded at Rainbow Studio in Oslo, Norway in August 1988

Personnel
Terje Rypdal — electric guitar 
Allan Dangerfield — keyboards, synclavier 
Bjørn Kjellemyr — acoustic bass, electric bass
Audun Kleive — drums

References

External links 
 Norwegian Legend Terje Rypdal at Guitar Player by Barry Cleveland January 30, 2014

ECM Records albums
Terje Rypdal albums
1989 albums
Albums produced by Manfred Eicher